Genomatica is a San Diego-based biotechnology company that develops and licenses biological manufacturing processes for the production of intermediate and basic chemicals. Genomatica’s process technology for the chemical 1,4-Butanediol (BDO) is now commercial. Genomatica produced 5 million pounds of renewable BDO in five weeks at a DuPont Tate & Lyle plant in Tennessee. Its GENO BDO process has been licensed by BASF and by Novamont.

References 

Biotechnology companies of the United States